Dan Doyle is a former Republican state legislator and attorney from the U.S. state of Oregon. He represented Salem and served as co-chair of the Oregon Joint Ways and Means Committee.

He resigned from the House on January 31, 2005, and later pleaded guilty to falsifying reports relating to campaign finance.

References 

Living people
Oregon lawyers
Republican Party members of the Oregon House of Representatives
Politicians from Salem, Oregon
Prisoners and detainees of Oregon
Year of birth missing (living people)
Place of birth missing (living people)
Oregon politicians convicted of crimes
Lawyers from Salem, Oregon
21st-century American politicians